Lubenice is an ancient fort city on the island of Cres, Croatia that was founded approximately four thousand years ago on top of a 380 m high ridge that overlooks the Adriatic Sea. It is a small local center that comprises forty buildings and seven  permanent inhabitants. Buildings in the city are mainly constructed out of the same material as the surrounding cliffs, a lesser part dates back to a former settlement of ancient Romans. There are two well-preserved extant city gates on the North and South of the city as well a wall in the East.

It was nominated to be a UNESCO World Heritage site in 2005.

Gallery

See also
 Tentative list of World Heritage Sites in Croatia

Notes and references

Bibliography 

 Barbir, F. & Ulgiati, S. (2008), Sustainable Energy Production and Consumption: Benefits, Springer, 

Prehistoric Europe
Populated places in Primorje-Gorski Kotar County
Cres
Seaside resorts in Croatia
Liburnia